The B68 is a bus route that constitutes a public transit line operating in Brooklyn, New York City. The B68 is operated by the MTA New York City Transit Authority. Its precursor was a streetcar line that began operation in June 1862, and was known as the Coney Island Avenue Line. The route became a bus line in 1955.

Route description
The B68's northern terminus is at Prospect Park Southwest and Pritchard Square near the 15th Street–Prospect Park station in Park Slope. Service heads south via Prospect Park Southwest and Coney Island Avenue until Brighton Beach Avenue. Service then heads west via that street until West Brighton Avenue, before turning right onto West 5th Street. Buses then make lefts at Neptune Avenue and Stilwell Avenue before terminating at the Mermaid Bus Loop at Coney Island–Stillwell Avenue station.

History

As a horsecar line
The original line ran from the Boulevard entrance of Prospect Park (Park Circle) to Coney Island and was operated by the Coney Island and Brooklyn Railroad (CI&B). It was the first railroad of any kind to reach Coney Island. The CI&B connected to other lines to bring people from Brooklyn (then a city) and from New York City (then meaning Manhattan) to its service to Coney Island. It began operating service along the Smith Street Line to Fulton Ferry in June 1862, so that the line was commonly called the "Smith Street Line". It was also known as the "Slocum Road" after its president, Henry Warner Slocum, a Civil War general and New York congressman. Slocum's name is also associated with the steamboat General Slocum, involved in a disastrous fire on the East River. Most of the route operated alongside the Coney Island Plank Road, now Coney Island Avenue.

As a trolley line
In 1890, in order to compete better with the steam railroads that had been opened to Coney Island beginning in 1864, the CI&B became the first horsecar line in Kings County to electrify, using trolley wire.

The CI&B acquired the Grand Street, Prospect Park and Flatbush Railroad (Franklin Avenue Line) in the early 1890s, and leased the Brooklyn City and Newtown Rail Road (DeKalb Avenue Line) in 1897.

The Coney Island and Gravesend Railway, a Brooklyn Rapid Transit Company subsidiary, bought a majority of CI&B stock in 1913 or 1914; it remained part of the BRT (Brooklyn-Manhattan Transit Corporation after 1923) system until the BMT was purchased by the City of New York in 1940.

As a bus line
In 1955, this was the third-to-last Brooklyn streetcar line to be converted to bus operation and the fourth to last in the State of New York. Service was renumbered as the B68 bus. In July 2001, service was extended from West 5th Street to the Coney Island subway station.

On December 1, 2022, the MTA released a draft redesign of the Brooklyn bus network. As part of the redesign, B68 service would be rerouted to Kingsborough Community College in Manhattan Beach at its southern end and have its overnight service eliminated. Closely spaced stops would also be eliminated.

References

Streetcar lines in Brooklyn
B068
B068
Predecessors of the Brooklyn–Manhattan Transit Corporation
Defunct New York (state) railroads